Tilt-tray may refer to:

Tilt tray sorter
Tilt tray tow truck